Neiza Flores Ferrufino (born 19 December 1989) is a Bolivian futsal player and a footballer who plays as a midfielder for the Bolivia women's national team.

Early life
Flores hails from the Cochabamba Department.

International career
Flores played for Bolivia at senior level in three Copa América Femenina editions (2006, 2014 and 2018).

As a futsal player, Flores won the bronze medal with Bolivia at the 2018 South American Games.

References

External links

1989 births
Living people
Women's association football midfielders
Bolivian women's footballers
People from Cercado Province (Cochabamba)
Bolivia women's international footballers
Bolivian women's futsal players
South American Games bronze medalists for Bolivia
Competitors at the 2018 South American Games